NH 11A may refer to:

 National Highway 11A (India, old numbering)
 New Hampshire Route 11A, United States